Keith Hancock may refer to:
Sir Keith Hancock (historian) (1898–1988), Australian historian
Keith Hancock (musician), two-time Grammy-nominated music educator, winner of the Grammy Music Educator of the Year award in 2017
Keith Hancock (tennis) (born 1953), Australian tennis player